Excidobates is a genus of poison dart frogs endemic to the Marañón River drainage in Peru and Ecuador, South America. At one time members of this genus were classified as Dendrobates. A characteristic of this genus is the presence of pale, ovoid spots on the under surface of the thighs.

Species
The following species are included in the genus:

References

 
Poison dart frogs
Amphibians of South America
Amphibian genera